A gubernatorial election was held on 14 November 1986 to elect the Governor of ,  who is the southernmost and westernmost prefecture of Japan.

Candidates 

Junji Nishime, 65, incumbent since 1978, former Representative of the LDP, also backed by the DSP.
Mutsumi Kinjo, endorsed by the union of the left (Progress and Unity), including the OSMP, JSP and JCP.

Results

References 

1986 elections in Japan
Okinawa gubernatorial elections